Hulhumalé (Dhivehi: ހުޅުމާލެ) is a reclaimed island located in the south of North Malé Atoll, Maldives. The artificial island is being built up by pumping sand from the sea floor, in order to meet the existing and future housing, industrial and commercial development demands of the Malé region and as a response to the threat posed by rising sea levels. The official settlement was inaugurated by President Maumoon Abdul Gayoom on May 12, 2004.

The development and management of the island is undertaken by a government-owned corporation called Housing Development Corporation (formerly Hulhumalé Development Unit/Hulhumalé Development Corporation) which was incorporated on March 23, 2005.

Location within Malé City 
Hulhumalé is located northeast of the airport island of Hulhulé, to which it is connected by a causeway:

Hulhumalé is also represented at the local level  by one councilor in the Malé city council.

History

Initial reclamation (or Phase I), consisting of 45% of land mass, was carried out by the Ministry of Construction and Public Works (MCPW) at a cost of USD 11 million. The project was then continued by a Belgian Joint Venture Company, International Port Engineering and Management (IPEM) and Dredging International (DI) costing an estimated USD 21 million. All the works involving reclamation and coastal structure development covered in Phase I were completed by June 2002, and 1,000 residents moved to the island in 2004. In the next phase of reclamation, completed in 2015,  were added; and, by the end of 2019, there were more than 50,000 residents.

Development

 A basis of development known as Phase I was formed under the first Master Plan which was completed in July 2001 by a consortium of consultants from Singapore with the contribution of many government agencies, committees and individuals. It conceptually defines the long-term land use and development strategy (including urban design proposals, transportation plans and utility infrastructure) with considerations for future infrastructure connections to the adjacent Phase II and planned airport extension areas. The Master Plan is to be periodically reviewed and adjusted to include advances in development.

Phase I of the Master Plan includes:

Stage 1A (completed)
 A 280-room apartment complex with a combination of 2,3 and 4 bedroom units
 An integrated primary and secondary school housing 20 classrooms
 A public building for government and social requirements containing 32 units
 A hospital with 50 bed capacity
 A mosque for 1500 people
 Four commercial buildings with a total of 48 units
 An adequate land space for the cultivation of indigenous plants and imported varieties

Stage 1B (to be completed by December 2005)
 232 condominium housing units
 120 basic housing units
 169 beach plots
 56 standard plots
 132 terraced houses
 280 housing units
 57 residential beach front plots
 109 residential beach plots
 56 residential standard plots
 132 plots for terraced housing
 A public building with 32 public units

Stage 1C (planned for 2006)
 1900 housing units

Stage 2 (targeted for 2016)
 2950 housing units

Stage 3 (targeted for 2020)
 3075 housing units

Hulhumalé is underutilized relative to other central atolls in the Maldives. It would take the lead of the government to improve utilization by moving government ministers, government departments and public institutions to Hulhumalé and assisting public servants with relocation costs. Pending urban development, greenery landscaping would help make the place more attractive.

On 15 January 2015 the second reclamation phase of Hulhumalé was launched, which will include the construction of a youth centre. The $50 million project was awarded to Dredging International NV, Belgium earlier this year.

Transport 
Hulhumalé has road network which was planned together with the development of the island. 

The island is connected via a causeway to the airport island Hulhulé Island, allowing easy road transport between the Velana International Airport and Hulhumalé. With the opening of the Sinamalé Bridge between Hulhulé and Malé Island in September 2018, the road networks of the three islands were connected for the first time.

References

External links
 Housing Development Corporation
 NPR Morning Edition story, 28 Jan 2008

Islands of the Maldives
Populated coastal places in the Maldives
Artificial islands of the Maldives
Populated places in the Maldives
Climate change adaptation